The 34th Filmfare Awards were held in 1988, after a 2-year gap.

Tezaab led the ceremony with 12 nominations, followed by Qayamat Se Qayamat Tak with 11 nominations and Khoon Bhari Maang with 7 nominations.

Qayamat Se Qayamat Tak won 8 awards, including Best Film, Best Director (for Mansoor Khan), Best Male Debut (for Aamir Khan) and Best Female Debut (for Juhi Chawla), thus becoming the most-awarded film at the ceremony and catapulted Khan and Chawla to superstardom overnight.

Tezaab was the runner-up of the ceremony with 4 awards, including Best Actor (for Anil Kapoor), also catapulted Kapoor and Madhuri Dixit to superstardom overnight. The now-iconic song "Ek Do Teen" made Dixit a dance icon and the song itself fetched 2 awards – Best Female Playback Singer (for Alka Yagnik) and Best Choreography (for Saroj Khan).

Main awards

Best Film
 Qayamat Se Qayamat Tak 
Khoon Bhari Maang
Tezaab

Best Director
 Mansoor Khan – Qayamat Se Qayamat Tak 
N. Chandra – Tezaab
Rakesh Roshan – Khoon Bhari Maang

Best Actor
 Anil Kapoor – Tezaab 
Aamir Khan – Qayamat Se Qayamat Tak
Amitabh Bachchan – Shahenshah

Best Actress
 Rekha – Khoon Bhari Maang 
Juhi Chawla – Qayamat Se Qayamat Tak
Madhuri Dixit – Tezaab

Best Supporting Actor
 Anupam Kher – Vijay 
Chunky Pandey – Tezaab
Nana Patekar – Andha Yudh

Best Supporting Actress
 Sonu Walia – Khoon Bhari Maang 
Anuradha Patel – Ijaazat
Pallavi Joshi – Andha Yudh

Best Debut
 Aamir Khan – Qayamat Se Qayamat Tak

Lux New Face of the Year
 Juhi Chawla – Qayamat Se Qayamat Tak

Best Story
 Ijaazat – Subodh Ghosh

Best Screenplay
 Qayamat Se Qayamat Tak – Nasir Hussain

Best Dialogue
 Tezaab – Kamlesh Pandey

Best Music Director 
 Qayamat Se Qayamat Tak – Anand–Milind 
Khoon Bhari Maang – Rajesh Roshan
Tezaab – Laxmikant–Pyarelal

Best Lyricist
 Ijaazat – Gulzar for Mera Kuch Saamaan 
Qayamat Se Qayamat Tak – Majrooh Sultanpuri for Papa Kehte Hain
Tezaab – Javed Akhtar for Ek Do Teen

Best Playback Singer, Male
 Qayamat Se Qayamat Tak – Udit Narayan for Papa Kehte Hain 
Dayavan – Mohammad Aziz for Dil Tera Kisne Toda
Tezaab – Amit Kumar for Ek Do Teen

Best Playback Singer, Female
 Tezaab – Alka Yagnik for Ek Do Teen 
Khoon Bhari Maang – Sadhana Sargam for Main Teri Hoon Jaanam
Tezaab – Anuradha Paudwal for Keh Do Ke Tum

Best Art Direction
 Hatya  – Liladhar S. Sawant

Best Choreography
 Tezaab – Saroj Khan for Ek Do Teen

Best Cinematography
 Qayamat Se Qayamat Tak  – Kiran Deohans

Best Editing
 Khoon Bhari Maang  – Sanjay Varma

Best Sound
 Hatya  – J. P. Sehgal

Critics' awards

Best Film
 Om Dar Ba Dar

Most Wins
Qayamat Se Qayamat Tak – 8/11
Tezaab – 4/12
Khoon Bhari Maang – 3/7
Hatya – 2/2
Ijaazat – 2/2
Vijay – 1/1

See also
 35th Filmfare Awards
 Filmfare Awards

References

 https://www.imdb.com/event/ev0000245/1989/

Filmfare Awards
Filmfare